Bongha Maeul (봉하 마을; lit. "Bongha village") is a town in South Gyeongsang Province, South Korea. It is located near Gimhae and Busan, in southeastern South Korea. Bongha Maeul is notable for being the hometown of former President of South Korea Roh Moo-hyun, who committed suicide there on May 23, 2009.

References

External links
 Panoramio (Bongha is the village across the valley in this photo; Bonsan-ni is the closer one)
 travelro - photoes of Bongha

Gimhae
Roh Moo-hyun
Villages in South Korea